Mary Lawson may refer to:
 Mary Lawson (novelist) (born 1946), Canadian novelist
 Mary Lawson (actress) (1910–1941), British actress
 Mary Lawson (baseball) (1924–1997)
 Mary Camilla Lawson (1865–?), British politician
 Mary Gloria Lawson, Louisiana's first African American female lawyer
 Mary Lawson Elementary in Grahams Corner, Nova Scotia

See also
 Maria Lawson (disambiguation)